The Khulna Division cricket team is a first-class team representing the Khulna Division in south-west Bangladesh, one of the country's eight administrative regions. The team competes in the National Cricket League and was a participant in the now-defunct National Cricket League One-Day. In the short-lived National Cricket League Twenty20 competition, played in the 2009–10 season only, Khulna adopted the name Kings of Khulna and played in black and yellow. The equivalent team in the Bangladesh Premier League (BPL) is the Khulna Titans.

Khulna's main home ground is the Sheikh Abu Naser Stadium in Khulna city, which has a capacity of 15,000.

Khulna have won the NCL seven times, including the three consecutive seasons 2015–16, 2016–17, and 2017–18, and they won the 2002–03 National Cricket League One-Day.

Honours
 National Cricket League (7) – 2002–03, 2007–08, 2012–13, 2015–16, 2016–17, 2017–18, 2019–20
 One-Day Cricket League (1) – 2002–03

Seasons

Current squad
, the squad for the 2019–20 season.

Grounds
Until 2004 Khulna used Shamsul Huda Stadium in Jessore for its home matches. Since then it has played most of its home matches at Sheikh Abu Naser Stadium in Khulna (formerly known as Khulna Divisional Stadium and Bir Shrestha Shahid Flight Lieutenant Motiur Rahman Stadium), which is now also a Test venue.

Records
At the end of the 2019–20 season Khulna Division had played 161 first-class matches, with 50 wins, 39 losses and 72 draws. The highest score is 216 by Anamul Haque against Rangpur Division in 2017–18. The best innings bowling figures are 9 for 84 and 9 for 91, both by Abdur Razzak. Razzak also has the best match figures of 15 for 193 (8 for 123 and 7 for 70), against Barisal Division in 2011–12.

References

External links
 Khulna Division at CricketArchive
 CricInfo re Bangladesh

Other sources
 Wisden Cricketers Almanack (annual): various issues

Bangladeshi first-class cricket teams
Sport in Khulna Division
Bangladesh National Cricket League
1999 establishments in Bangladesh
Cricket clubs established in 1999